Animals are multicellular, eukaryotic organisms in the biological kingdom Animalia. With few exceptions, animals consume organic material, breathe oxygen, are able to move, can reproduce sexually, and grow from a hollow sphere of cells, the blastula, during embryonic development. Over 1.5 million living animal species have been described—of which around 1 million are insects—but it has been estimated there are over 7 million animal species in total. They have complex interactions with each other and their environments, forming intricate food webs. The scientific study of animals is known as zoology.

Most living animal species are in Bilateria, a clade whose members have a bilaterally symmetric body plan. The Bilateria include the protostomes, containing animals such as nematodes, arthropods, flatworms, annelids and molluscs, and the deuterostomes, containing the echinoderms and the chordates, the latter including the vertebrates. Life forms interpreted as early animals were present in the Ediacaran biota of the late Precambrian. Many modern animal phyla became clearly established in the fossil record as marine species during the Cambrian explosion, which began around 539 million years ago. 6,331 groups of genes common to all living animals have been identified; these may have arisen from a single common ancestor that lived 650 million years ago.

Historically, Aristotle divided animals into those with blood and those without. Carl Linnaeus created the first hierarchical biological classification for animals in 1758 with his Systema Naturae, which Jean-Baptiste Lamarck expanded into 14 phyla by 1809. In 1874, Ernst Haeckel divided the animal kingdom into the multicellular Metazoa (now synonymous for Animalia) and the Protozoa, single-celled organisms no longer considered animals. In modern times, the biological classification of animals relies on advanced techniques, such as molecular phylogenetics, which are effective at demonstrating the evolutionary relationships between taxa.

Humans make use of many animal species, such as for food (including meat, milk, and eggs), for materials (such as leather and wool), as pets, and as working animals including for transport. Dogs have been used in hunting, as have birds of prey, while many terrestrial and aquatic animals were hunted for sports. Nonhuman animals have appeared in art from the earliest times and are featured in mythology and religion.

Etymology

The word "animal" comes from the Latin , meaning 'having breath', 'having soul' or 'living being'. The biological definition includes all members of the kingdom Animalia. In colloquial usage, the term animal is often used to refer only to nonhuman animals. The term "metazoa" is derived from the Ancient Greek μετα (meta, meaning "later") and ζῷᾰ (zōia, plural of ζῷον zōion, meaning animal).

Characteristics

Animals have several characteristics that set them apart from other living things. Animals are eukaryotic and multicellular. Unlike plants and algae, which produce their own nutrients, animals are heterotrophic, feeding on organic material and digesting it internally. With very few exceptions, animals respire aerobically. All animals are motile (able to spontaneously move their bodies) during at least part of their life cycle, but some animals, such as sponges, corals, mussels, and barnacles, later become sessile. The blastula is a stage in embryonic development that is unique to animals, allowing cells to be differentiated into specialised tissues and organs.

Structure

All animals are composed of cells, surrounded by a characteristic extracellular matrix composed of collagen and elastic glycoproteins. During development, the animal extracellular matrix forms a relatively flexible framework upon which cells can move about and be reorganised, making the formation of complex structures possible. This may be calcified, forming structures such as shells, bones, and spicules. In contrast, the cells of other multicellular organisms (primarily algae, plants, and fungi) are held in place by cell walls, and so develop by progressive growth. Animal cells uniquely possess the cell junctions called tight junctions, gap junctions, and desmosomes.

With few exceptions—in particular, the sponges and placozoans—animal bodies are differentiated into tissues. These include muscles, which enable locomotion, and nerve tissues, which transmit signals and coordinate the body. Typically, there is also an internal digestive chamber with either one opening (in Ctenophora, Cnidaria, and flatworms) or two openings (in most bilaterians).

Reproduction and development

Nearly all animals make use of some form of sexual reproduction. They produce haploid gametes by meiosis; the smaller, motile gametes are spermatozoa and the larger, non-motile gametes are ova. These fuse to form zygotes, which develop via mitosis into a hollow sphere, called a blastula. In sponges, blastula larvae swim to a new location, attach to the seabed, and develop into a new sponge. In most other groups, the blastula  undergoes more complicated rearrangement. It first invaginates to form a gastrula with a digestive chamber and two separate germ layers, an external ectoderm and an internal endoderm. In most cases, a third germ layer, the mesoderm, also develops between them. These germ layers then differentiate to form tissues and organs.

Repeated instances of mating with a close relative during sexual reproduction generally leads to inbreeding depression within a population due to the increased prevalence of harmful recessive traits. Animals have evolved numerous mechanisms for avoiding close inbreeding.

Some animals are capable of asexual reproduction, which often results in a genetic clone of the parent. This may take place through fragmentation; budding, such as in Hydra and other cnidarians; or parthenogenesis, where fertile eggs are produced without mating, such as in aphids.

Ecology

Animals are categorised into ecological groups depending on how they obtain or consume organic material, including carnivores, herbivores, omnivores, detritivores, and parasites. Interactions between animals form complex food webs. In carnivorous or omnivorous species, predation is a consumer–resource interaction where a predator feeds on another organism (called its prey). Selective pressures imposed on one another lead to an evolutionary arms race between predator and prey, resulting in various anti-predator adaptations. Almost all multicellular predators are animals. Some consumers use multiple methods; for example, in parasitoid wasps, the larvae feed on the hosts' living tissues, killing them in the process, but the adults primarily consume nectar from flowers. Other animals may have very specific feeding behaviours, such as hawksbill sea turtles primarily eating sponges.

Most animals rely on the biomass and energy produced by plants through photosynthesis. Herbivores eat plant material directly, while carnivores, and other animals on higher trophic levels typically acquire it indirectly by eating other animals. Animals oxidize carbohydrates, lipids, proteins, and other biomolecules, which allows the animal to grow and to sustain biological processes such as locomotion. Animals living close to hydrothermal vents and cold seeps on the dark sea floor consume organic matter of archaea and bacteria produced in these locations through chemosynthesis (by oxidizing inorganic compounds, such as hydrogen sulfide).

Animals originally evolved in the sea. Lineages of arthropods colonised land around the same time as land plants, probably between 510 and 471 million years ago during the Late Cambrian or Early Ordovician. Vertebrates such as the lobe-finned fish Tiktaalik started to move on to land in the late Devonian, about 375 million years ago. Animals occupy virtually all of earth's habitats and microhabitats, including salt water, hydrothermal vents, fresh water, hot springs, swamps, forests, pastures, deserts, air, and the interiors of animals, plants, fungi and rocks. Animals are however not particularly heat tolerant; very few of them can survive at constant temperatures above . Only very few species of animals (mostly nematodes) inhabit the most extreme cold deserts of continental Antarctica.

Diversity

Size

The largest terrestrial animals that ever lived were titanosaur sauropod dinosaurs such as Argentinosaurus, which may have weighed as much as 73 tonnes, and Supersaurus which may have reached 39 meters. Several animals are microscopic; some Myxozoa (obligate parasites within the Cnidaria) never grow larger than 20 µm, and one of the smallest species (Myxobolus shekel) is no more than 8.5 µm when fully grown.

Numbers and habitats
The following table lists estimated numbers of described extant species for all the animal groups, along with their principal habitats (terrestrial, fresh water, and marine), and free-living or parasitic ways of life. Species estimates shown here are based on numbers described scientifically; much larger estimates have been calculated based on various means of prediction, and these can vary wildly. For instance, around 25,000–27,000 species of nematodes have been described, while published estimates of the total number of nematode species include 10,000–20,000; 500,000; 10 million; and 100 million. Using patterns within the taxonomic hierarchy, the total number of animal species—including those not yet described—was calculated to be about 7.77 million in 2011.

Evolutionary origin

Animals are found as long ago as the Ediacaran biota, towards the end of the Precambrian, and possibly somewhat earlier. It had long been doubted whether these life-forms included animals, but the discovery of the animal lipid cholesterol in fossils of Dickinsonia establishes their nature. Animals are thought to have originated under low-oxygen conditions, suggesting that they were capable of living entirely by anaerobic respiration, but as they became specialized for aerobic metabolism they became fully dependent on oxygen in their environments.

Many animal phyla first appear in the fossil record during the Cambrian explosion, starting about 539 million years ago, in beds such as the Burgess shale. Extant phyla in these rocks include molluscs, brachiopods, onychophorans, tardigrades, arthropods, echinoderms and hemichordates, along with numerous now-extinct forms such as the predatory Anomalocaris. The apparent suddenness of the event may however be an artefact of the fossil record, rather than showing that all these animals appeared simultaneously. 
That view is supported by the discovery of Auroralumina attenboroughii, the earliest known Ediacaran crown-group cnidarian (557–562 mya, some 20 million years before the Cambrian explosion) from Charnwood Forest, England. It is thought to be one of the earliest predators, catching small prey with its nematocysts as modern cnidarians do.

Some palaeontologists have suggested that animals appeared much earlier than the Cambrian explosion, possibly as early as 1 billion years ago. Early fossils that might represent animals appear for example in the 665-million-year-old rocks of the Trezona Formation of South Australia. These fossils are interpreted as most probably being early sponges. 
Trace fossils such as tracks and burrows found in the Tonian period (from 1 gya) may indicate the presence of triploblastic worm-like animals, roughly as large (about 5 mm wide) and complex as earthworms. However, similar tracks are produced today by the giant single-celled protist Gromia sphaerica, so the Tonian trace fossils may not indicate early animal evolution. Around the same time, the layered mats of microorganisms called stromatolites decreased in diversity, perhaps due to grazing by newly evolved animals. Objects such as sediment-filled tubes that resemble trace fossils of the burrows of wormlike animals have been found in 1.2 gya rocks in North America, in 1.5 gya rocks in Australia and North America, and in 1.7 gya rocks in Australia. Their interpretation as having an animal origin is disputed, as they might be water-escape or other structures.

Phylogeny

Animals are monophyletic, meaning they are derived from a common ancestor. Animals are sister to the Choanoflagellata, with which they form the Choanozoa. The most basal animals, the Porifera, Ctenophora, Cnidaria, and Placozoa, have body plans that lack bilateral symmetry. Their relationships are still disputed; the sister group to all other animals could be the Porifera or the Ctenophora, both of which lack hox genes, important in body plan development.

These genes are found in the Placozoa and the higher animals, the Bilateria. 6,331 groups of genes common to all living animals have been identified; these may have arisen from a single common ancestor that lived 650 million years ago in the Precambrian. 25 of these are novel core gene groups, found only in animals; of those, 8 are for essential components of the Wnt and TGF-beta signalling pathways which may have enabled animals to become multicellular by providing a pattern for the body's system of axes (in three dimensions), and another 7 are for transcription factors including homeodomain proteins involved in the control of development.

The phylogenetic tree indicates approximately how many millions of years ago the lineages split.

Non-bilateria 

Several animal phyla lack bilateral symmetry. Among these, the sponges (Porifera) probably diverged first, representing the oldest animal phylum. Sponges lack the complex organization found in most other animal phyla; their cells are differentiated, but in most cases not organised into distinct tissues. They typically feed by drawing in water through pores.

The Ctenophora (comb jellies) and Cnidaria (which includes jellyfish, sea anemones, and corals) are radially symmetric and have digestive chambers with a single opening, which serves as both mouth and anus. They are sometimes placed together in the group Coelenterata because of common traits, not because of close relationships. Animals in both phyla have distinct tissues, but these are not organised into organs. They are diploblastic, having only two main germ layers, ectoderm and endoderm. The tiny placozoans are similar, but they do not have a permanent digestive chamber.

Bilateria 

The remaining animals, the great majority—comprising some 29 phyla and over a million species—form a clade, the Bilateria, which have a bilaterally symmetric body plan. The Bilateria are triploblastic, with three well-developed germ layers, and their tissues form distinct organs. The digestive chamber has two openings, a mouth and an anus, and there is an internal body cavity, a coelom or pseudocoelom. These animals have a head end (anterior) and a tail end (posterior),  a back (dorsal) surface and a belly (ventral) surface, and a left and a right side.

Having a front end means that this part of the body encounters stimuli, such as food, favouring cephalisation, the development of a head with sense organs and a mouth. Many bilaterians have a combination of circular muscles that constrict the body, making it longer, and an opposing set of longitudinal muscles, that shorten the body; these enable soft-bodied animals with a hydrostatic skeleton to move by peristalsis. They also have a gut that extends through the basically cylindrical body from mouth to anus. Many bilaterian phyla have primary larvae which swim with cilia and have an apical organ containing sensory cells. However, over evolutionary time, descendant spaces have evolved which have lost  one or more of each of these characteristics. For example, adult echinoderms are radially symmetric (unlike their larvae), while some parasitic worms have extremely simplified body structures.

Genetic studies have considerably changed zoologists' understanding of the relationships within the Bilateria. Most appear to belong to two major lineages, the protostomes and the deuterostomes. The basalmost bilaterians are the Xenacoelomorpha.

Protostomes and deuterostomes 

Protostomes and deuterostomes differ in several ways. Early in development, deuterostome embryos undergo radial cleavage during cell division, while many protostomes (the Spiralia) undergo spiral cleavage.
Animals from both groups possess a complete digestive tract, but in protostomes the first opening of the embryonic gut develops into the mouth, and the anus forms secondarily. In deuterostomes, the anus forms first while the mouth develops secondarily. Most protostomes have schizocoelous development, where cells simply fill in the interior of the gastrula to form the mesoderm. In deuterostomes, the mesoderm forms by enterocoelic pouching, through invagination of the endoderm.

The main deuterostome phyla are the Echinodermata and the Chordata. Echinoderms are exclusively marine and include starfish, sea urchins, and sea cucumbers. The chordates are dominated by the vertebrates (animals with backbones), which consist of fishes, amphibians, reptiles, birds, and mammals. The deuterostomes also include the Hemichordata (acorn worms).

Ecdysozoa

The Ecdysozoa are protostomes, named after their shared trait of ecdysis, growth by moulting. They include the largest animal phylum, the Arthropoda, which contains insects, spiders, crabs, and their kin. All of these have a body divided into repeating segments, typically with paired appendages. Two smaller phyla, the Onychophora and Tardigrada, are close relatives of the arthropods and share these traits. The ecdysozoans also include the Nematoda or roundworms, perhaps the second largest animal phylum. Roundworms are typically microscopic, and occur in nearly every environment where there is water; some are important parasites. Smaller phyla related to them are the Nematomorpha or horsehair worms, and the Kinorhyncha, Priapulida, and Loricifera. These groups have a reduced coelom, called a pseudocoelom.

Spiralia 

The Spiralia are a large group of protostomes that develop by spiral cleavage in the early embryo. The Spiralia's phylogeny has been disputed, but it contains a large clade, the superphylum Lophotrochozoa, and smaller groups of phyla such as the Rouphozoa which includes the gastrotrichs and the flatworms. All of these are grouped as the Platytrochozoa, which has a sister group, the Gnathifera, which includes the rotifers.

The Lophotrochozoa includes the molluscs, annelids, brachiopods, nemerteans, bryozoa and entoprocts. The molluscs, the second-largest animal phylum by number of described species, includes snails, clams, and squids, while the annelids are the segmented worms, such as earthworms, lugworms, and leeches. These two groups have long been considered close relatives because they share trochophore larvae.

History of classification

In the classical era, Aristotle divided animals, based on his own observations, into those with blood (roughly, the vertebrates) and those without. The animals were then arranged on a scale from man (with blood, 2 legs, rational soul) down through the live-bearing tetrapods (with blood, 4 legs, sensitive soul) and other groups such as crustaceans (no blood, many legs, sensitive soul) down to spontaneously generating creatures like sponges (no blood, no legs, vegetable soul). Aristotle was uncertain whether sponges were animals, which in his system ought to have sensation, appetite, and locomotion, or plants, which did not: he knew that sponges could sense touch, and would contract if about to be pulled off their rocks, but that they were rooted like plants and never moved about.

In 1758, Carl Linnaeus created the first hierarchical classification in his Systema Naturae. In his original scheme, the animals were one of three kingdoms, divided into the classes of Vermes, Insecta, Pisces, Amphibia, Aves, and Mammalia. Since then the last four have all been subsumed into a single phylum, the Chordata, while his Insecta (which included the crustaceans and arachnids) and Vermes have been renamed or broken up. The process was begun in 1793 by Jean-Baptiste de Lamarck, who called the Vermes une espèce de chaos (a chaotic mess) and split the group into three new phyla: worms, echinoderms, and polyps (which contained corals and jellyfish). By 1809, in his Philosophie Zoologique, Lamarck had created 9 phyla apart from vertebrates (where he still had 4 phyla: mammals, birds, reptiles, and fish) and molluscs, namely cirripedes, annelids, crustaceans, arachnids, insects, worms, radiates, polyps, and infusorians.

In his 1817 Le Règne Animal, Georges Cuvier used comparative anatomy to group the animals into four embranchements ("branches" with different body plans, roughly corresponding to phyla), namely vertebrates, molluscs, articulated animals (arthropods and annelids), and zoophytes (radiata) (echinoderms, cnidaria and other forms). This division into four was followed by the embryologist Karl Ernst von Baer in 1828, the zoologist Louis Agassiz in 1857, and the comparative anatomist Richard Owen in 1860.

In 1874, Ernst Haeckel divided the animal kingdom into two subkingdoms: Metazoa (multicellular animals, with five phyla: coelenterates, echinoderms, articulates, molluscs, and vertebrates) and Protozoa (single-celled animals), including a sixth animal phylum, sponges. The protozoa were later moved to the former kingdom Protista, leaving only the Metazoa as a synonym of Animalia.

In human culture

Practical uses 

The human population exploits a large number of other animal species for food, both of domesticated livestock species in animal husbandry and, mainly at sea, by hunting wild species. Marine fish of many species are caught commercially for food. A smaller number of species are farmed commercially. Humans and their livestock make up more than 90% of the biomass of all terrestrial vertebrates, and almost as much as all insects combined.

Invertebrates including cephalopods, crustaceans, and bivalve or gastropod molluscs are hunted or farmed for food. Chickens, cattle, sheep, pigs, and other animals are raised as livestock for meat across the world. Animal fibres such as wool are used to make textiles, while animal sinews have been used as lashings and bindings, and leather is widely used to make shoes and other items. Animals have been hunted and farmed for their fur to make items such as coats and hats. Dyestuffs including carmine (cochineal), shellac, and kermes have been made from the bodies of insects. Working animals including cattle and horses have been used for work and transport from the first days of agriculture.

Animals such as the fruit fly Drosophila melanogaster serve a major role in science as experimental models. Animals have been used to create vaccines since their discovery in the 18th century. Some medicines such as the cancer drug Yondelis are based on toxins or other molecules of animal origin.

People have used hunting dogs to help chase down and retrieve animals, and birds of prey to catch birds and mammals, while tethered cormorants have been used to catch fish. Poison dart frogs have been used to poison the tips of blowpipe darts.
A wide variety of animals are kept as pets, from invertebrates such as tarantulas and octopuses, insects including praying mantises, reptiles such as snakes and chameleons, and birds including canaries, parakeets, and parrots all finding a place. However, the most kept pet species are mammals, namely dogs, cats, and rabbits. There is a tension between the role of animals as companions to humans, and their existence as individuals with rights of their own.
A wide variety of terrestrial and aquatic animals are hunted for sport.

Symbolic uses 

Animals have been the subjects of art from the earliest times, both historical, as in Ancient Egypt, and prehistoric, as in the cave paintings at Lascaux. Major animal paintings include Albrecht Dürer's 1515 The Rhinoceros, and George Stubbs's c. 1762 horse portrait Whistlejacket. Insects, birds and mammals play roles in literature and film, such as in giant bug movies. 

Animals including insects and mammals feature in mythology and religion. In both Japan and Europe, a butterfly was seen as the personification of a person's soul, while the scarab beetle was sacred in ancient Egypt. Among the mammals, cattle, deer, horses, lions, bats, bears, and wolves are the subjects of myths and worship. The signs of the Western and Chinese zodiacs are based on animals.

See also

 Animal attacks
 Animal coloration
 Ethology
 Fauna
 List of animal names
 Lists of organisms by population

Notes

References

External links

 Tree of Life Project 
 Animal Diversity Web – University of Michigan's database of animals
 Wildscreen Arkive – multimedia database of endangered/protected species

 
Animals
Cryogenian first appearances
Taxa named by Carl Linnaeus